K. P. Krishnakumar (1958 – 26 December 1989) was an Indian sculptor and painter.

Life 
Krishnakumar was born in Kuttippuram, Kerala. He attended Visva-Bharati University.

Krishnakumar helped to lead the Indian Radical Painters' and Sculptors' Association, which ceased to exist following his death.

He committed suicide on 26 December 1989.

Art 
Krishnakumar's oeuvre includes a number of figures of young men, which Jhaveri suggests are self-portraits. Wyma argues that his Vasco da Gama (1985) explores themes of colonialism. He was influenced by Pablo Picasso, Auguste Rodin, and director Jean-Luc Godard.

Krishnakumar was exhibited at the Kochi-Muziris Biennale in 2013.

Notes

Sources

External links

 Shivaji Panikkar on the works of K. P. Krishnakumar
 Report on an exhibition of Krishnakumar's work at Malayala Manorama

Painters from Kerala
Indian male painters
1958 births
1989 deaths
20th-century Indian painters
People from Malappuram district
20th-century Indian male artists